Events from the year 1594 in France

Incumbents
 Monarch – Henry IV

Events
6 to 17 September – Siege of Morlaix
1 to 19 November – Siege of Fort Crozon

Births

June – Nicolas Poussin, painter (d. 1665)
8 December – Pierre Petit, astronomer, physicist, mathematician and instrument maker (d. 1677)

Full date missing

Charles Audran, engraver (d. 1674)
Noël Quillerier, painter (d. 1669)
Pierre de Saint-Joseph, French Cistercian monk, philosopher, and theologian (d. 1662)
Jacques de Serisay, poet, intendant of the duc de La Rochefoucauld, and the founding director of the Académie française (d. 1653)

Deaths
29 December – Jean Châtel (b. 1575)

Full date missing
Charles II de Bourbon-Vendôme, prince and cardinal (b. 1562)
Claude Dupuy  jurist, humanist and bibliophile, (b. 1545)

See also

References

1590s in France